is a passenger railway station on the Minato Line in the city of Hitachinaka, Ibaraki, Japan, operated by the third-sector railway operator Hitachinaka Seaside Railway.

Lines

Station layout
The station is unstaffed and consists of a single curved side platform serving the single-track line.

History
Isozaki Station opened on 3 September 1924.

Passenger statistics
In fiscal 2011, the station was used by an average of 83 passengers daily.

Surrounding area
Isozaki Post Office
National Institute of Information and Communications Technology Sunspot Research Center

See also
 List of railway stations in Japan

References

External links

 Hitachinaka Seaside Railway station information 

Railway stations in Ibaraki Prefecture
Railway stations in Japan opened in 1924
Hitachinaka, Ibaraki